Vamsa Vruksham is a 1980 Indian Telugu-language drama film directed by Bapu. It is a remake of the 1972 Kannada film Vamsha Vriksha which was based on S. L. Bhyrappa's novel of same name. Mullapudi Venkata Ramana wrote the screenplay. The film stars Anil Kapoor, J. V. Somayajulu, Kanta Rao, Mukkamala, and Jyothi. The film marked Kapoor's debut as an actor in a lead role.

Released on 20 November 1980, the film was not commercially successful. It was later dubbed into Hindi as Pyaar Ka Sindoor in 1986.

Cast
Anil Kapoor
J. V. Somayajulu
Kanta Rao
Mukkamala
Jyothi
Kona Madhusudana Rao
Sujatha
Jitendra Mohan
Ramanatham
Sripada Hanumachchastri

Soundtrack 
The film features score by K. V. Mahadevan with lyrics by C. Narayana Reddy.

Awards
Filmfare Awards South
Filmfare Best Director Award (Telugu) – Bapu
Filmfare Best Actress Award (Telugu) - Jyothi

References

External links
 

Films directed by Bapu
Films with screenplays by Mullapudi Venkata Ramana
1980s Telugu-language films
1980 films
Indian drama films
Telugu remakes of Kannada films
Films scored by K. V. Mahadevan
1980 drama films